Pearson College may refer to:

 Pearson College (UK) in London and Manchester, United Kingdom
 Pearson College UWC, a United World College, located in Victoria, British Columbia, Canada

See also
 Pierson College, a residential college of Yale University